Moritz Friedrich, better known by his stage name Siriusmo, is a Berlin-based German record producer.  Initially influenced by Led Zeppelin, Jimi Hendrix, Squarepusher, and Aphex Twin, his tracks can be broadly defined as electronic, and are formulated with a variety of samples.

Biography
The first band that Moritz Friedrich is known to have been in was a group called Sirius. After growing bored of playing the same songs, Moritz left Sirius, taking the band name with him. He based his new pseudonym around the old band name, adding "mo" from his first name to create Sirius.Mo, and later, Siriusmo.

Throughout his career, which began with the single "Ne Me Quitte Pas" in 2000, Siriusmo has recorded prolifically. His music has been released with a number of different labels, including Grand Petrol Recordings and Boys Noize Records. The majority of his releases have been done through Monkeytown Records, a record label  founded by Modeselektor with the goal of gently forcing Moritz to work on an album.

He also published a large number of remixes; for example, Gossip, Digitalism, Scissor Sisters, Simian Mobile Disco, Boys Noize, and Sido. His debut album Mosaik was released in February 2011 on Monkeytown Records, and provides a mix of genres at the intersection of techno, house, and hip hop.

Siriusmo has worked consistently with the Berlin-based graphical artist Jens Tümmel in the creation of his album art, associated videos, and merchandise. Jens' artistic style can especially be seen on many of Siriusmo's album covers.

Personal life
Moritz was born in 1976 and grew up in Friedrichshagen in East Berlin; he has two brothers and a sister. Besides his work as a producer, he has worked as a graffiti artist, a children's book illustrator, a wall mural designer, a plasterer, and a carpenter.

Discography

Studio albums

Compilation albums

Extended plays and singles

Collaborations

Producer

Music videos

Remixes

Sampled By

Filmography

Soundtracks

References

External links 
 Siriusmo at Instagram
 Siriusmo in MySpace
 Siriusmo at SoundCloud
 Siriusmo at Monkeytown Records
 Siriusmo at Facebook
 Siriusmo at Twitter

German electronic musicians
German record producers
German techno musicians
Year of birth missing (living people)
Living people
Musicians from Berlin
Nu-disco musicians
Musical groups from Berlin